The Auckland Harbour Bridge is an eight-lane motorway bridge over the Waitematā Harbour in Auckland, New Zealand. It joins St Marys Bay on the Auckland city side with Northcote on the North Shore side. It is part of State Highway 1 and the Auckland Northern Motorway. The bridge is operated by the NZ Transport Agency (NZTA). It is the second-longest road bridge in New Zealand, and the longest in the North Island.

The original inner four lanes, opened in 1959, are of box truss construction. Two lanes that were added to each side in 1968–1969 are of orthotropic box structure construction and are cantilevered off the original piers. The bridge is 1,020 m (3,348 ft) long, with a main span of 243.8 metres, rising 43.27 metres above high water, allowing ships access to the deepwater wharf at the Chelsea Sugar Refinery, one of the few such wharves west of the bridge.

While often considered an Auckland icon, many see the construction of the bridge without walking, cycling, and rail facilities as a big oversight. In 2016, an add-on structure providing a walk-and-cycleway called SkyPath received Council funding approval and planning consent, but wasn't built. In 2021, a stand-alone walking and cycling bridge called the Northern Pathway was announced by the New Zealand Government, but also wasn't built.

About 170,000 vehicles cross the bridge each day (as of 2019), including more than 1,000 buses, which carry 38% of all people crossing during the morning peak.

Background
Prior to the opening of the bridge in 1959, the quickest way from Auckland to the North Shore was by passenger or vehicular ferry.

As early as 1860, engineer Fred Bell, commissioned by North Shore farmers who wanted to herd animals to market in Auckland, had proposed a harbour crossing in the general vicinity of the bridge. It would have used floating pontoons, but the plan failed due to the £16,000 cost estimate ($1.9 million, adjusted for inflation as of March 2017). Additional structures for a bridge crossing the harbour were proposed in 1927 and 1929,

In the 1950s, when the bridge was being built, North Shore was a mostly rural area of barely 50,000 people, with few jobs and a growth rate half that of Auckland south of the Waitematā Harbour. Opening up the area via a new route unlocked the potential for further expansion of Auckland.

Construction

Initial structure

The recommendations of the design team and the report of the 1946 Royal Commission were for five or six traffic lanes, with one or two of them to be reversed in direction depending on the flow of traffic, and with a footpath for pedestrians on each side. The latter features were dropped for cost reasons before construction started, the First National Government of New Zealand opting for an 'austerity' design of four lanes without footpaths, and including an approach road network only after local outcry over traffic effects. The decision to reduce the bridge in this way has been called "a ringing testament to [...] the peril of short-term thinking and penny-pinching". On 1 December 1950, an act of parliament formed the Auckland Harbour Bridge Authority, chaired by Sir John Allum, then Mayor of Auckland City, who appointed British firm Freeman Fox & Partners to design the bridge.

The bridge took four years to build, with Dorman Long (who had constructed the Sydney Harbour Bridge) and the Cleveland Bridge & Engineering Company contracted to construct the bridge in October 1954. The first stage of construction involved land reclamation at the Westhaven Marina, which was completed by September 1955. The steel girder structure pieces were fabricated in England and shipped to New Zealand. The steel bridge structure began erection in December 1956. Hundreds of labourers were employed on the construction including 180 men sent out from the UK. Progress was slowed with the workers going on strike in 1956 and 1957. The large steel girder sections were partially pre-assembled, then floated into place on construction barges. One of the main spans was almost lost during stormy weather when the barge began to drift, but the tugboat William C Daldy won a 36-hour tug-of-war against the high winds.

The bridge was constructed from opposing sides of the harbour. The southern section was cantilevered, until both sides were joined in March 1959. Completed in April 1959, three weeks ahead of schedule, the bridge was officially opened on 30 May 1959 by the Governor-General Lord Cobham. An open day had been held, when 106,000 people had walked across. The opening period was extremely busy, despite the poor weather in Auckland experienced in June 1959. Either three or four men had been killed by accidents during construction, and the names of three of them are recorded on a memorial plaque underneath the bridge at the Northcote end.

The hollow girder design by Freeman, Fox and Partners design was unprecedented in New Zealand, and fell outside the 1950s building codes in New Zealand. Initial plans for the bridge were for an extremely slender structure, only 2.9 metres thick, due to the competing specifications from two stakeholders: the National Roads Board specified the gradient and locations where the bridge could launch from the shore on either side of the harbour, while the Auckland Harbour Board required an opening of 43.5 metres above the high tide point. Public Works commissioner Bob Norman, concerned about the narrow bridge design, attempted to negotiate with both the Roads Board and Harbour Board for additional width allowance for the bridge. The Harbour Board required the 43.5 metre clearance so that the entire fleet of ships operating within New Zealand could navigate the harbour, the largest of which was the P&O cruise liner SS Canberra. Norman argued that the Canberra was extremely unlikely to use the only major dock west of the bridge at the Chelsea Sugar Refinery, so the Harbour Board agreed to a smaller opening. This allowed Freeman Fox and Partners to redesign the bridge, increasing the width of the deep centre span from 2.9 metres to 4.12 metres. By the 1970s, many box girder bridges began to develop structural problems, such as the Freeman Fox and Partners-designed West Gate Bridge in Melbourne which collapsed in 1970. The Auckland Harbour Bridge was inspected by the design firm, which found that the stiffening member had buckled by 61mm, so it was decided to strengthen the bridge's girder system.

Paid for by government-backed loans, the bridge started out as a toll bridge, the first one in New Zealand, with toll booths at the northern end for north-bound and south-bound traffic. Tolls were originally 2/6 (2 shillings and six pence: approximately $5.50 in 2018) per car but were reduced to 2/- (2 shillings: approximately $4.47 in 2018) after 15 months of operation. The toll remained at 2 shillings until New Zealand changed to decimal currency in July 1967, when that amount became 20 cents in the conversion. It was increased in 1980 from 20 to 25 cents (approximately $1.21 in 2018). Tolling was later made north-bound only before being discontinued on 31 March 1984, and the booths were removed. The toll system was removed as the cost of collection began to outweigh the profits. When this happened, the Auckland Harbour Bridge Authority enquired if the National Roads Board would take over operations if the toll booths were removed, which they agreed to. When the bridge became toll free, most of the Auckland Harbour Bridge Authority staff were absorbed into the roads board.

Some critics have alleged that the routing of State Highway 1 over the bridge was motivated by the need to create toll revenue, and led to a decades-long delay on finishing the Western Ring Route around Auckland, significantly contributing to the need for a massive motorway through the city centre of Auckland and severely damaging inner-city suburbs such as Freemans Bay and Grafton.

'Nippon clip-ons'

The bridge was originally built with four lanes for traffic. Owing to the rapid expansion of suburbs on the North Shore and increasing traffic levels, it was soon necessary to increase capacity – by 1965, the annual use was about 10 million vehicles, three times the original forecast. In 1967, a contract was let to Japanese firm Ishikawajima-Harima Heavy Industries Co., Ltd. (now IHI Corporation) to construct two steel box girder bridges affixed to the Harbour Bridge, to greatly increase the number of lanes on the bridge. The girder sections were prefabricated in Japan and transported to New Zealand on a converted oil tanker. The eastern section was completed in January 1969, while the western side was completed shortly before the additional lanes were formally opened on 23 September 1969. Each side added two additional lanes to the bridge, doubling the number of lanes to eight.

As the sections were manufactured by a Japanese company, this led to the nickname 'Nippon clip-ons'. The selection of the company was considered a bold move at the time, barely 20 years after WWII and with some considerable anti-Japanese sentiment still existing. The costs of the additions were much higher than if the extra lanes had been provided initially.

The clip-ons have been plagued by significant issues. In 1987, cracks required major repair works, and in 2006, further cracks and signs of material fatigue were found. The clip-ons were originally to have a life expectancy of 50 years. Auckland City Council's Transport Committee requested Transit New Zealand to investigate the future of the clip-ons as part of its ten-year plan. Transit noted that the plan already includes some funding for bridge maintenance.

In May 2007, Transit proposed a bylaw change banning vehicles over 4.5 tonnes from the outside lane on each clip-on to reduce stress on the structure. This was changed in July 2007 to a bylaw banning vehicles of 13 tonnes or more, based on the high level of voluntary compliance during the previous months.

In 2007, it was announced that NZ$45 million in maintenance work on the clip-ons was brought forward as part of good practice. In October 2007, a 2006 report from Beca Group surfaced in the press, noting that the clip-ons were at risk of catastrophic, immediate failure in circumstances such as a traffic jam trapping a large number of trucks. Transit noted that this situation was extremely unlikely, and measures already implemented would prevent it from occurring. In January 2008, it became known that even after the multimillion-dollar maintenance works, a full ban for trucks on all clip-on lanes might be required, or the working life could be reduced to only ten more years.

In late 2009, it was announced that due to greater than expected complexity of the task and increasing material costs for the 920 tons of reinforcing material instead of the approximately half amount of that originally envisaged, clip-on maintenance costs had increased by a further NZ$41 million. NZTA noted that the clip-ons would not be able to be strengthened again after the current works were finished. However, after completion of the upgrade, the bridge would have a further life of between 20 and 40 years if truck restrictions were reintroduced in 10–20 years on the northbound clip-on.

Traffic management

A "tidal flow" system is in place, with the direction of the two centre lanes changed to provide an additional lane for peak-period traffic. During the morning peak, five of the eight lanes are for southbound traffic; in the afternoon, five lanes are northbound. At other times, the lanes are split evenly, but peak traffic has become proportionately less – in 1991 there was often a higher than 3:1 difference in directional traffic; in 2006, this had dropped to around 1.6:1. The bridge has an estimated capacity of 180,000 vehicles per day, and in 2006 had an average volume of 168,754 vehicles per day (up from 122,000 in 1991).

In March 1982, the Ministry of Transport and Auckland Harbour Bridge Authority conducted a week-long traffic blitz in an attempt to improve the standard of driving. Of the 600,000 vehicles which used the bridge over this period, 6,000 were stopped, with half of those receiving a ticket and the rest cautioned. A second blitz was held for 36 hours a few weeks later.

For many years, lane directions were indicated by overhead signals. In the late 1980s, a number of fatal head-on accidents occurred when vehicles crossed lane markings into the path of oncoming traffic. In 1990, a movable concrete safety barrier was put in place to separate traffic heading in opposite directions and eliminate head-on accident. Two specially designed barrier transfer machines moved the barrier by one lane four times a day, at a speed of 6 km/h, the first concrete safety barrier of its kind installed on a box girder bridge in the world.

In March 2009, the barrier transfer machines, which had lasted four times their original design life of five years, and the barrier were replaced. The new machines are capable of moving the barrier in half the time the old machines did. The concrete barrier blocks and the metal expansion blocks have been reduced in width by 200 mm, giving more width in the lanes either side of the barrier.

As part of the Victoria Park Tunnel project, the moveable barrier has been extended southwards to the Fanshawe Street onramp.

Event management 

As part of large events such as the Auckland Marathon, normal motorway restrictions on access are sometimes relaxed. December 2011 was the first time that cyclists were officially allowed on the bridge, for a race / community cycling event organised by Telstra Clear, Auckland Transport, NZTA and Cycle Action Auckland, also allowing cyclists on the Northern Busway. The up to 9000 riders were protected by 160 stationary buses used as a 'guard of honour' between the bridge end and the Northern Busway from traffic on the rest of the motorway, which will stay open.

Proposed walk- and cycleway

Original proposal
When the bridge was built, rail lines and walking paths were dropped for cost reasons, and neither were they included during the clip-on construction (people can walk on the span only via guided tours). After the early 1990s increase in public transportation patronage in Auckland, the Ministry of Works and Development investigated if the 'clip-ons' could be used for a light rail system, which they found was feasible if the lanes were used exclusively for this purpose. In 2007 discussions about the addition of a cycle and footpath link was mooted. Transit noted that this would cost between NZ$20 million and $40 million, but public support has been polled as very high. The GetAcross group and Cycle Action Auckland argue that lower-cost options are available, and that provision for a walk- and cycleway could relatively easily be included in the bridge strengthening works currently being planned for the clip-ons.

The GetAcross group is showcasing its proposed walking/cycling solution, called SkyPath, on its website and invites visitors to sign a petition supporting or opposing the proposal.

A 2008 proposal to modify the clip-ons and potentially widen them to add walking and cycling paths met with different reactions. While Auckland Regional Council and North Shore City Council voted to support it (under certain conditions), Auckland City Council considered the costs to be too high. Other stakeholders such as the NZ Transport Agency (NZTA) considered the proposal as not having enough merit for the $22–53 million price tag, though campaigners note that the costs cited for the project include 45% contingencies. A proposal from the Auckland Regional Council (one of the proponents) to open up part of the clip-on structure for a walking / cycling trial use over several summer weekends, to show whether it would attract enough users, did not go forward.

Protests

On Sunday, 24 May 2009, thousands of people crossed the bridge as a part of a protest by GetAcross against the bridge not providing walking and cycling access, and against what the group perceives to be the authorities' negative and obstructionist attitude towards such access.<ref name="POWER">"People power breaks barricades". The New Zealand Herald, 24 May 2009</ref> A crossing either as part of the protest or as part of the official 50-year anniversary celebrations had been forbidden by NZTA because of the costs and traffic difficulties claimed for a managed crossing. However, after several speeches, including by Auckland Regional Council Chairman Mike Lee, several people made their way around the police cordon onto the bridge. At that stage police closed the northbound lanes to traffic, bringing State Highway 1 to a stop. The remainder of the protesters moved onto the bridge, which was not resisted any more by the police. No accidents, violence or arrests were reported, and protesters left the bridge approximately an hour later, many having crossed to the North Shore and back.

The protest created a wide spectrum of responses in the media and in public perception, from being labelled a dangerous stunt representative of an increasingly lawless, anarchic society to being considered a successful signal to authorities to give more weight to the demands and the public backing of the walk and cycleway proponents. Authorities noted that they were investigating whether any of the protesters would face fines or charges. NZTA representatives noted that they were disappointed at what they considered the broken word of the organisers of the protest, and remarked that it would take 30 more years before walking and cycling could likely be provided (see also "Second Harbour Crossing" below). NZTA were criticised as having brought the situation at least partly onto themselves by choosing the easy route of forbidding the protest crossing. Several political protest marches (especially hīkoi) had been allowed to cross the bridge.

Updated proposal
Because of the costs of the proposal and increasing information about the problematic state of the clip-ons, the GetAcross campaign in late 2009 proposed an alternative solution, with a single shared walking and cycling path slung under the eastern clip-on. As confirmed by NZTA, this clip-on has significantly more remaining load capacity (it is used by fewer heavy trucks, being the route of (often empty) trucks returning to Ports of Auckland) and as the proposal would not require widening, the costs have been preliminarily assessed as of the order of NZ$12 million.

The group proposes to raise the majority of the funding via a loan backed by small tolls, of the order of NZ$1 for regular users. NZTA noted that it would be considering the proposal, should funding be able to be secured by the campaigners.

In 2011, the proposal got new public support when Auckland Mayor Len Brown agreed that a walk- and cycleway was a desirable goal, and instructed Auckland Transport to add it to its strategic priorities. The walk- and cycleway is also to be included in the city centre masterplan. Three council-controlled organisations (CCOs) – Auckland Transport, the Waterfront Development Agency and the Tourism, Events and Economic Development Agency – indicated support for the proposal, as has the Heart of the City (Auckland CBD) business association.

In August 2011, an editorial in The New Zealand Herald'' gave conditional support to the newest proposal, noting that a toll-based funding model and the partially enclosed weather-protected design of the $23 million proposal by Hopper Developments would appear to cover most concerns.

Approval
In 2014, the proposed walk and cycleway was publicly notified, and consent was given in 2015. However, this was appealed by three local groups (two which later dropped out of the appeal). The decision of the original hearing was upheld in December 2016, and the last appeal rejected by the Environment Court. In the meantime, Council had already provided in principle approval for a public-private partnership funding model, in a unanimous support vote earlier in 2016.

A 2019 announcement said that work on the walking and cycling "clipon" could start in 2020. Mayoral candidate John Tamihere proposed replacement with a 10-lane lower level plus rail and cycling/pedestrian facilities on an upper level.

Protests over lack of progress 
On 30 May 2021, approximately 1000 cyclists crossed the bridge following a rally at Point Erin Park organised by Bike Auckland. The rally called for a trial cycle lane on the bridge to be opened by the summer and included speeches by Auckland Central MP Chlöe Swarbrick and former associate minister of transport Julie Anne Genter. The rally was motivated by a lack of progress on SkyPath, which had been delayed earlier in the year due to technical issues. The unauthorised crossing of the bridge and breaching of the police cordon led to the closure of two northbound lanes. No injuries were reported however one person was arrested for breaching the cordon.

In response to the proposal for a trial cycle lane, NZTA stated that a cycle lane would likely require two lanes in order to provide sufficient protection for cyclists and pedestrians. The agency also needs to perform modelling to determine the impact of lane closures before it can come to a decision on the proposal.

Stand-alone bridge 
In June 2021, Transport Minister Michael Wood announced a new stand-alone walking and cycling bridge would be built on the eastern side of the Auckland Harbour Bridge. Called the Northern Pathway, the bridge was estimated to cost a total of $785 million dollars and had the support of Auckland mayor Phil Goff who said it would benefit both Aucklanders and tourists.

The plan received criticism from cycling, trucking and other transport advocates, as well as from the government opposition parties. In October 2021, Wood announced the project had been scrapped due to lack of public support. He said Waka Kotahi had spent $51 million on designs, consultants and engineering plans for the project up until the end of September, and the final amount spent was not known.

Utilities
The bridge supports several utility services, including water and gas pipelines and fibre-optic telecommunications cables.

Transpower reached agreement with Transit in 2005 for the installation of cable supports beneath the bridge for a future cross-harbour power cable. In 2012, Transpower installed three 220,000-volt cables on the bridge, linking Hobson Street substation in the Auckland CBD to the Wairau Road substation on the North Shore.

Bungy jumping
Bungy operator AJ Hackett operates a 40-m bungy jump from the bridge and offers a bridge climb with views of the city and the harbour.

Second Harbour Crossing

Almost since the bridge as built reached capacity, before extension via the clip-ons, a second crossing of the harbour was mooted. The high costs and the difficulties of connecting it to the motorway network have so far caused plans to remain at concept stage. In 2008, a study group narrowed down around 160 options to a multi-tunnel link approximately one km east of the bridge, with up to four individual tunnels for motorway, public transport and rail. The proposal has not continued to a political decision or funding stage, though designations are being protected to ensure that development will not prevent the tunnels being built.

Suicides
The bridge sees a small number of suicide attempts, with between one and two people each year dying from jumping into the Waitematā Harbour.

2020 structural damage 
In September 2020 high winds caused a heavy goods vehicle to tip and crash into the bridge structure inflicting significant damage. Temporary repairs were effected using a locally fabricated replacement member, pending a full engineering analysis and design of long-term solution. On 4 October, a permanent replacement strut was installed, with all lanes opening again on 7 October 2020.

See also

General
Bridges in New Zealand
Public transport in Auckland
Transport in Auckland

Specific
Central Motorway Junction, the major motorway junction connecting southeast of the bridge
Newmarket Viaduct, similarly important traffic bottleneck on other side of Auckland CBD
Western Reclamation, large industrial area east of the bridge, possible southern end of second crossing

References

External links

 NZTA Auckland Harbour Bridge – home page
 Engineering Heritage – Auckland Harbour Bridge (from the IPENZ website)
 
 Historical photos (from the Transit New Zealand website)
 Get Across (website advocating a Harbour Bridge walking and cycling facility)
 Photographs of Auckland Harbour Bridge held in Auckland Libraries' heritage collections.

Cantilever bridges
Steel bridges in New Zealand
Bridges in Auckland
Bridges completed in 1959
Tourist attractions in Auckland
Cycling in New Zealand
State Highway 1 (New Zealand)
Roads with a reversible lane
Bungee jumping sites
Former toll bridges
1950s architecture in New Zealand
Waitematā Harbour